David Ernest Silinde (born 28 July 1984) is a Tanzanian CCM politician and Member of Parliament for Mbozi West constituency since 2010. He is a Deputy Minister in President's office, Regional Administration and Local Government appointed by President John Magufuli.

References

1984 births
Living people
Chama Cha Mapinduzi MPs
Chama Cha Mapinduzi politicians
Tanzanian MPs 2010–2015
Tanzanian MPs 2020–2025
Minaki Secondary School alumni
University of Dar es Salaam alumni
Tanzanian Roman Catholics
Deputy government ministers of Tanzania